Cleopatra is an 1876 opera by Lauro Rossi to a libretto by Marco D'Arienzo based on Shakespeare's Antony and Cleopatra. The opera was first performed on 5 March 1876 at the Teatro Regio in Turin.

Recording
Cleopatra -   (Cleopatra), Alessandro Liberatore (Marco Antonio), Paolo Pecchioli (Ottavio Cesare), Sebastian Catana (Diomede), William Corrò (Proculejo), Tiziana Carraro (Ottavia), Paola Gardina (Carmiana);  & Coro Lirico Marchigiano 'V. Bellini', David Crescenzi. Naxos DVD or 2CD

References

External links
 Libretto, Turin 1876, archive.org
 Libretto, Turin 1878, loc.gov
 Libretto , Naxos Records
 Work details, Corago, University of Bologna

1876 operas
Italian-language operas
Depictions of Cleopatra in opera
Operas
Works based on Antony and Cleopatra
Cultural depictions of Augustus